The 1912–13 season was the third season of competitive football by Ayr United.

Competitions

Friendly and benefit matches

Scottish Second Division

Matches

Scottish Qualifying Cup

Scottish Cup

Ayrshire Cup

Ayr Charity Cup

Statistics

League table

Results by round

Notes

References

Ayr United F.C. seasons
AYr